Reade Peak is a peak, 1,060 m, rising 1 mile south of Sonia Point and Flandres Bay, on the northeast coast of Kyiv Peninsula, Graham Land, Antarctica. Mapped by the Falkland Islands Dependencies Survey (FIDS) from photos taken by Hunting Aerosurveys Ltd. in 1956–57. Named by the United Kingdom Antarctic Place-Names Committee (UK-APC) in 1960 for Joseph Bancroft Reade (1801–70), English pioneer of photography, who obtained photographs on paper coated with silver nitrate, developed with gallic acid and fixed with hyposulphate of soda, in 1837.

References
 SCAR Composite Gazetteer of Antarctica.

Mountains of Graham Land
Danco Coast